The Latin American Art Museum of Buenos Aires (MALBA) is a museum located on Figueroa Alcorta Avenue, in the Palermo section of Buenos Aires.

Created by Argentine businessman Eduardo Costantini, the museum is operated by the not-for-profit Fundación MALBACostantini, and was inaugurated on September 21, 2001. The institution was organized around the Costantini Collection, and has continued to expand its selection of works from modern artists across Latin America. It also maintains a cultural center, which stages art and film exhibitions and develops cultural activities. The museum receives over a million visitors annually, and is sustained by over 1,400 active patrons.

The museum design was made through an open call contest.; 450 proposals from 45 countries were presented. The selection was made by an international jury of architects, and the first prize was awarded to three young Argentinian architects: Gaston Atelman, Martin Fourcade and Alfredo Tapia. The building project was executed by AFT Architects, an Argentine architectural firm.

The mission of the MALBA is to collect, preserve, research and promote Latin American art from the onset of the 20th century to the present. This involves educating the public about Latin American artists, and the diversity of cultural and artistic holdings in this region.

Gallery

References

MALBA article on Fotopedia

External links
 

Art museums and galleries in Argentina
Culture in Buenos Aires
Museums in Buenos Aires
Buildings and structures completed in 2001
Art museums established in 2001
2001 establishments in Argentina